Alvia J. Wardlaw (born November 5, 1947) is an American art scholar, and one of the country's top experts on African-American art. She is Curator and Director of the University Museum at Texas Southern University, an institution central to the development of art by African Americans in Houston. She also is a professor of Art History at Texas Southern University. Wardlaw is a member of the Scholarly Advisory Council of the National Museum of African American History and Culture, and co-founded the National Alliance of African and African American Art Support groups in 1998. Wardlaw was University of Texas at Austin's first African-American PhD in Art History.

Career
From 1995 to 2009, Wardlaw was Curator of Modern and Contemporary Art at the Museum of Fine Arts, Houston, where she organized more than 75 exhibitions on African and African-American art. She was adjunct curator of African-American Art at the Dallas Museum of Art in 1994. Her exhibition The Quilts of Gee’s Bend, a collection of quilts by outstanding quilters from Alabama, broke attendance records at major museums across the 11 cities to which it traveled and was one of the most talked-about museum shows of 2002 in America and beyond. She has presented exhibitions that added to the American art canon the work of major, previously undercelebrated African-American artists, in particular John Biggers, Thornton Dial and Kermit Oliver. Her own photographs were also shown across Texas. She grew up and lives in Third Ward, Houston, Texas.

Education
Wardlaw received a B.A. degree in Art History from Wellesley College in 1969. In 1986 she earned an M.A. degree in Art History from the New York University Institute of Fine Arts. In 1996 she received a Ph.D. degree in Art History from the University of Texas at Austin.

Exhibitions curated 

 2006: Thorton Dial in the 21st Century; Museum of Fine Arts, Houston, exhibit and catalogue
 2002–2006: The Quilts of Gees Bend – 11 cities
 Our New Day Begun: African American Artists Entering the Millennium, exhibition catalogue, LBJ Library and Museum
 Roy DeCarava: Photographs, exhibition and exhibition catalogue, The Museum of Fine Arts, Houston
 Ceremonies and Visions: The Art of John Biggers Homecoming. African American Family History in Georgia John Biggers: Bridges 1995: John Biggers: View from the Upper Room, Museum of Fine Arts, Houston
 2005: Notes from a Child’s Odyssey: The Art of Kermit Oliver, Museum of Fine Arts Houston
 2008: Houston Collects: African American Art, Museum of Fine Arts, Houston

Wardlaw has historicized John Biggers' art philosophy, based in large part on his travels to Africa and his celebration of the African-American community, his legacy and impact on student artists who studied with him, and his impact upon the modern art world. She has mentored countless students of color to pursue careers in the museum field, ranging from curatorial to conservation positions.

 Writing 

 Dominique de Menil asked her to write an essay for the groundbreaking exhibition The De Luxe Show, August 22, 1971, pairing the works of notable white and black artists. 
 The exhibition Handcrafted, an early show at the Studio Museum [in Harlem, 1972].
 The Art of John Biggers: View from the Upper Room (with essays by Edmund Barry Gaither, Alison de Lima Greene, and Robert Farris Thompson), Museum of Fine Arts (Houston, TX), 1995.
 (Editor) Grant Hill, Something All Our Own: The Grant Hill Collection of African American Art, Duke University Press (Durham, NC), 2004.
 Notes from a Child's Odyssey: The Art of Kermit Oliver, Museum of Fine Arts (Houston, TX), 2005.
 Charles Alston, Pomegranate (Petaluma, CA), 2007.
 Also author of Black Art, Ancestral Legacy: The African Impulse in African-American Art, as an accompaniment to the exhibition. Contributor of articles and poetry to various publications, including The Black Scholar.
 Collecting African American Art: the Museum of Fine Arts Houston, 2009.

 Awards 

 Fulbright Fellowship in  West Africa, Liberia, Sierra Leone and Senegal in 1984
 Fulbright Award for study in Tanzania, East Africa in 1997
 Senior Fellow for the 2001 American Leadership Forum
 Texas Women's Hall of Fame in 1994
 Award of Merit from the University of Texas at Austin
 Ethos Founders Award from Wellesley College
 African American Living Legend by African-American News and Issues Texas Southern University’s Research Scholar of the Year in 2009. 
 In addition, Black Art Ancestral Legacy was named Best Exhibition of 1990 by D Magazine, and The Quilts of Gee’s Bend'' received the International Association of Art Critics Award in 2003.

References 

Living people
American art historians
Women art historians
American art curators
American women curators
Texas Southern University faculty
Academics from Houston
1947 births
American women academics
African-American historians
African-American curators
African-American academics
Historians from Texas
20th-century American historians
20th-century American women writers
21st-century American historians
21st-century American women writers
Wellesley College alumni
New York University Institute of Fine Arts alumni
University of Texas at Austin alumni
20th-century African-American women writers
20th-century African-American writers
21st-century African-American women writers
21st-century African-American writers